Zachary Joseph Reks (born November 12, 1993) is an American professional baseball outfielder for the Lotte Giants of the KBO League. He previously played in Major League Baseball (MLB) for the Los Angeles Dodgers and Texas Rangers.

Amateur career
Reks attended Carl Sandburg High School in Orland Park, Illinois. He played one year of college baseball at the United States Air Force Academy before transferring to the University of Kentucky as a student. After not playing for two years he joined the Kentucky Wildcats baseball team as a walk-on in 2016. He played two seasons at Kentucky, before being drafted by the Los Angeles Dodgers in the 10th round of the 2017 Major League Baseball draft.

Professional career

Los Angeles Dodgers
Reks spent his first professional season with the Ogden Raptors, Great Lakes Loons and Rancho Cucamonga Quakes, batting .317 with two home runs over 47 games between the three teams. He played 2018 with Rancho Cucamonga and the Tulsa Drillers, slashing .303/.374/.424 with five home runs and forty RBIs in 88 games. He started 2019 with Tulsa before being promoted to the Oklahoma City Dodgers. He played in 121 games total with a .291 average and 28 homers with 93 RBI.

The Dodgers added Reks to their 40-man roster after the 2020 season and was promoted to the majors for the first time on June 21, 2021. He had been hitting .341 with five homers and 19 RBI for Oklahoma City at the time of his call-up. He made his MLB debut the same day, as the starting left fielder against the San Diego Padres. He had two at-bats in the game, a strikeout and a lineout to center. He was returned to the minors the following day. Reks had 10 at-bats in six games for the Dodgers and struck out seven times. In the minors, he hit .280 in 87 games for Oklahoma City, with 19 homers and 67 RBI.

Texas Rangers
On November 22, 2021, Reks and Billy McKinney were traded to the Texas Rangers for cash considerations. He recorded his first MLB hit on April 30, 2022 off Bryce Elder of the Atlanta Braves. Reks was designated for assignment on July 16, 2022. He was released on July 20.

Lotte Giants
On July 20, 2022, Reks signed with the Lotte Giants of the KBO League. On November 18, 2022, Reks re-signed a one-year deal for the 2023 season worth $1.3 million.

References

External links

1993 births
Living people
Baseball players from Chicago
Major League Baseball outfielders
Los Angeles Dodgers players
Texas Rangers players
Lotte Giants players
Air Force Falcons baseball players
Kentucky Wildcats baseball players
Ogden Raptors players
Great Lakes Loons players
Rancho Cucamonga Quakes players
Tulsa Drillers players
Estrellas Orientales players
American expatriate baseball players in the Dominican Republic
Oklahoma City Dodgers players
Round Rock Express players
Military personnel from Illinois